Amjad Parvez (born 28 March 1945) is a Pakistani engineer, writer, and a singer.

He has served as chief engineer, general manager, vice president and managing director of Nespak (National Engineering Services Pakistan).

Personal life

Background
Parvez was born in Lahore, Pakistan in 1945 to Sheikh Abdul Karim who was head of the Chemistry department, Islamia College, Lahore. Parvez's grandfather Khwaja Dil Muhammad was the principal at Islamia College, Lahore. He was also a poet of the Pakistan Movement as his nationalistic poems were read in the annual conventions of Anjuman-e-Himayat-e-Islam mostly presided by Allama Iqbal.

Parvez completed his basic education at Central Model School, Lahore in 1960. He then joined Government College, Lahore (GCU) and University of Engineering and Technology, Lahore (UET) from where he graduated in Mechanical Engineering in 1967. After joining UET in the Faculty of Mechanical Engineering, he proceeded to the University of Birmingham, UK, in 1968, where he qualified for a master's degree in Quality and Reliability Engineering in 1969 and a Doctorate in Engineering Production in 1972.

Career
Parvez served Nespak (National Engineering Services Pakistan) for nearly 30 years, rose to the positions of general manager and Vice President, and retired as managing director and President in 2005.  During his tenure as managing director, he brought in a significant annual amount of business for Nespak.

After retirement from Nespak, Parvez joined as professor at UET responsible for teaching and research at graduate and post-graduate levels in its Industrial & Manufacturing Engineering Department. He also set up a consulting company for UET namely 'Engineering Services UET Pakistan Limited (ESUPAK)'. From 2011 to 2013, he served as the Head of Department for Mechanical Engineering at the University of Lahore. He is a visiting faculty member at Lahore Leads University.

Awards and recognition
 Gold Medal Award by the President of Pakistan for writing the best technical paper for the Institution of Engineers, Pakistan, in 1977 
 Dr. A. Q. Khan Lifetime Achievement Award from the Institution of Engineers, Pakistan in 2009 
Pride of Performance Award in 2000 by the President of Pakistan.

Music
Parvez says he has had a passion for music since his childhood. He began his career as a child artist in 1954 at Radio Pakistan, Lahore in the children's programme 'Honhaar' before appearing on 'Khatir-e-Ehbaab' in the sixties. He trained in classical singing from the Ustads of Sham Chaurasia gharana such as Ustad Nazakat Ali Khan-Ustad Salamat Ali Khan duo (became their pupil in 1976), Ustad Ghulam Shabbir Khan-Ustad Ghulam Jaffar Khan duo (1992), and music composers Akhtar Hussain Akhian and veteran music composer Mian Sheheryaar. He is a practising singer at the Central Production Unit, Radio Pakistan, where he has recorded hundreds of ghazals, geets, and other songs since the 1970s in his monthly performances. For the past two decades, he has performed a raag for the programme "Ahang-e-Khusrovi" every month and has rendered more than fifty raags in Khayal form. Parvez performs both light, semi-classical music and classical music songs.

Parvez has also been associated with Pakistan Television Corporation (PTV) since its inception in 1964.  In his career, he has also performed in the US, UK, France, Italy, Norway, Denmark, Egypt, Saudi Arabia, Qatar, UAE, Bahrain, Myanmar and India.

Writings
Parvez's writings has been widely recognised. He has written a regular column reviewing books for The Nation (Pakistan), daily newspaper in Lahore, Pakistan for the past three decades.
 His writings have been collected in two volumes: ‘Symphony of Reflections’ (2006), and 'Rainbow Of Reflections' (2011). Both books were published by Jahangir Books, Lahore.
Parvez also speaks and writes on music. His book titled 'Melody Makers of the subcontinent' covers 47 music composers of India and Pakistan from the 1950s to 1980s. It was published by Sange-Meel Publications, Lahore in 2012.

Bibliography
 Symphony of Reflections 2006. (Jehangir Books, Lahore) 
 Rainbow of Reflections, Jahangir Books 2011.
 Melody Makers of the subcontinent, Sange-Meel Publications 2012.
 Melody Singers 1 (English) Sange-Meel Publications 2015
  Melody Singers 1 (Urdu)    Sange-Meel Publications 2017
  Melody Singers 2 (English)  Sange-Meel Publications 2019
  Rainbow of Reflections (Under Print)

See also
 List of Pakistani writers
 List of Urdu-language writers
 List of Pakistani ghazal singers
 Ghazal

References

External links
 UAE is fertile ground for Urdu singers, Gulfnews.com

Living people
1945 births
Pakistani mechanical engineers
Pakistani male singers
Pakistani ghazal singers
Pakistani writers about music
Recipients of the Pride of Performance
University of the Punjab alumni
University of Engineering and Technology, Lahore alumni
Government College University, Lahore alumni
Academic staff of the University of Engineering and Technology, Lahore
Academic staff of the University of Lahore